Conwy is a walled town and community in north Wales. 

Conwy may also refer to these proximate things:
 Conwy (electoral ward), a county division coterminous with the town
 Conwy County Borough, a principal local government area (from 1996) 
 the River Conwy (Afon Conwy)
 Conwy County Borough Council, a local authority 
 Conwy Borough F.C. (formerly Conwy United), a part-time football club 
 Conwy railway station, a train request stop 

Defunct administrative areas:
 Conwy (UK Parliament constituency) (1950–2010)
 Conwy (National Assembly for Wales constituency) (1999–2007)
 Conwy (municipal borough) (1885–1974)

See also
Conway (disambiguation)